Melnaattu Marumagal is a 1975 Indian Tamil-language film directed by A. P. Nagarajan, starring Sivakumar, Laurance Pourtale, Kamal Haasan and Jayasudha. Vani Ganapathy, a danseuse appeared only for a dance sequence alongside Haasan, whom she later married in 1978. In 1976, the film was remade in Telugu as America Ammayi.

Plot 

The film is about two brothers, Mohan and Raja, and their spouses. Sivakumar marries a European girl who admires Tamil culture and tradition. Meanwhile, Raja marries a Tamil girl who is attracted to Western customs.

Cast 
 Sivakumar as Mohan
 Kamal Haasan as Raja
 'Kumari' Laurance Pourtale as Meena
 Jayasudha as Sudha
 Jr. Balaiah as Valu
 S. V. Ramadoss
 Ganthimathi as Pangajam
 Poornam Viswanathan as Pazhanivel
 V. Gopalakrishnan
 Usha Uthup
 Vani Ganapathy in a guest appearance
 Cho Ramaswamy in a guest appearance
 Manorama in a guest appearance

Production 
Melnaattu Marumagal was directed by A. P. Nagarajan, and produced by C. N. Venkatasamy under C. N. V. Movies.

Soundtrack 
The music was composed by Kunnakudi Vaidyanathan, while the lyrics were written by 'Poovai' Senguttavan, 'Ulandhurpettai' Shanmugam, 'Nellai' Arulmani, 'Tiruchy' Bharathan, Geetha Priyan and Kuyili.

Reception 
Kanthan of Kalki praised the performances of Sivakumar, Kamal Haasan, Poornam Viswanathan but felt none of the songs stay in the mind and called the cinematography as average.

References

External links 
 

1970s Tamil-language films
1975 films
Films about interracial romance
Films directed by A. P. Nagarajan
Films scored by Kunnakudi Vaidyanathan
Films with screenplays by A. P. Nagarajan
Tamil films remade in other languages